David Rayfiel (September 9, 1923 – June 22, 2011) was an American screenwriter and frequent collaborator of director Sydney Pollack.

Life
Rayfiel was born in Brooklyn, New York and educated at Brooklyn College. His father was congressman Leo F. Rayfiel.

In 1950 he married television screenwriter Lila Garrett. He and Garrett had daughter Eliza before divorcing in 1953.  He married actress Maureen Stapleton in 1963, divorcing in 1966.  He married his third wife, Lynne Schwarzenbek, in 1987.

In 1958 he had a house built at Day, New York, which has come to be known as the David Rayfiel House, listed on the National Register of Historic Places in 2009.

Death
Rayfiel died of heart failure, on June 22, 2011, in Manhattan, New York.

Awards
In 1976, he received an Edgar Allan Poe Award for Best Motion Picture Screenplay for Three Days of the Condor with Lorenzo Semple, Jr.  He received a César Award in 1981 for Death Watch.

Screenplays
The Slender Thread (uncredited) (1965)
This Property is Condemned (1966)
Castle Keep (1969)
Valdez Is Coming (1971)
Lipstick (1976)
Three Days of the Condor (1975)
Death Watch (La mort en direct) (1980)
Absence of Malice (uncredited) (1981)
Round Midnight (1986)
The Morning After (uncredited) (1986)
Havana (1990)
The Firm (1993)
Intersection (1994)
Sabrina (1995)
Random Hearts (uncredited) (1999)
The Interpreter (uncredited) (2005)

References

External links

1923 births
2011 deaths
American male screenwriters
People from Brooklyn
Brooklyn College alumni
Yale School of Drama alumni
Screenwriters from New York (state)